Shaunavon is a former provincial electoral district  for the Legislative Assembly of the province of Saskatchewan, Canada. This district was created before the 8th Saskatchewan general election in 1934 as "Gull Lake". Redrawn and renamed "Shaunavon" in 1952, the constituency was abolished before the 23rd Saskatchewan general election in 1995.

It is now part of the districts of Wood River and Cypress Hills.

Members of the Legislative Assembly

Gull Lake (1934 – 1952)

Shaunavon (1952 – 1995)

Election results

Gull Lake (1934 – 1952)

|-

|style="width: 130px"|Farmer-Labour
|Herman Henry Kemper
|align="right"|2,404
|align="right"|38.27%
|align="right"|–

 
|Conservative
|John Frederick Frook
|align="right"|1,725
|align="right"|27.46%
|align="right"|–
|- bgcolor="white"
!align="left" colspan=3|Total
!align="right"|6,282
!align="right"|100.00%
!align="right"|

|-

 
|CCF
|Herman Henry Kemper
|align="right"|3,732
|align="right"|48.89%
|align="right"|+10.62
|- bgcolor="white"
!align="left" colspan=3|Total
!align="right"|7,633
!align="right"|100.00%
!align="right"|

|-
 
|style="width: 130px"|CCF
|Al Murray
|align="right"|3,942
|align="right"|52.57%
|align="right"|+3.68

 
|Prog. Conservative
|Charles H. Howlett
|align="right"|1,356
|align="right"|18.09%
|align="right"|-
|- bgcolor="white"
!align="left" colspan=3|Total
!align="right"|7,498
!align="right"|100.00%
!align="right"|

|-
 
|style="width: 130px"|CCF
|Al Murray
|align="right"|4,251
|align="right"|52.03%
|align="right"|-0.54

|Jonas A. Johnson
|align="right"|2,983
|align="right"|36.51%
|align="right"|–

|- bgcolor="white"
!align="left" colspan=3|Total
!align="right"|8,170
!align="right"|100.00%
!align="right"|

|-
 
|style="width: 130px"|CCF
|Thomas Bentley
|align="right"|3,627
|align="right"|51.36%
|align="right"|-0.67

 
|Prog. Conservative
|Charles H. Howlett
|align="right"|643
|align="right"|9.10%
|align="right"|-
|- bgcolor="white"
!align="left" colspan=3|Total
!align="right"|7,062
!align="right"|100.00%
!align="right"|

Shaunavon (1952 – 1995)

|-
 
|style="width: 130px"|CCF
|Thomas Bentley
|align="right"|3,625
|align="right"|54.22%
|align="right"|+2.86

|- bgcolor="white"
!align="left" colspan=3|Total
!align="right"|6,686
!align="right"|100.00%
!align="right"|

|-
 
|style="width: 130px"|CCF
|Thomas Bentley
|align="right"|3,185
|align="right"|45.00%
|align="right"|-9.22

|- bgcolor="white"
!align="left" colspan=3|Total
!align="right"|7,078
!align="right"|100.00%
!align="right"|

|-
 
|style="width: 130px"|CCF
|Arthur Kluzak
|align="right"|2,743
|align="right"|39.28%
|align="right"|-5.72

 
|Prog. Conservative
|Donald McLennan
|align="right"|849
|align="right"|12.16%
|align="right"|-
|- bgcolor="white"
!align="left" colspan=3|Total
!align="right"|6,984
!align="right"|100.00%
!align="right"|

|-

 
|CCF
|Arthur Kluzak
|align="right"|2,545
|align="right"|37.84%
|align="right"|-1.44
 
|Prog. Conservative
|Clifford B. Clark
|align="right"|1,225
|align="right"|18.22%
|align="right"|+6.06
|- bgcolor="white"
!align="left" colspan=3|Total
!align="right"|6,725
!align="right"|100.00%
!align="right"|

|-

 
|NDP
|Robert B. Fulton
|align="right"|2,684
|align="right"|46.48%
|align="right"|+8.64
|- bgcolor="white"
!align="left" colspan=3|Total
!align="right"|5,775
!align="right"|100.00%
!align="right"|

|-
 
|style="width: 130px"|NDP
|Allan Oliver
|align="right"|3,127
|align="right"|52.12%
|align="right"|+5.64

|- bgcolor="white"
!align="left" colspan=3|Total
!align="right"|5,999
!align="right"|100.00%
!align="right"|

|-

 
|NDP
|Allan Oliver
|align="right"|2,593
|align="right"|35.34%
|align="right"|-16.78
 
|Prog. Conservative
|Eric Slater
|align="right"|1,375
|align="right"|18.74%
|align="right"|-
|- bgcolor="white"
!align="left" colspan=3|Total
!align="right"|7,338
!align="right"|100.00%
!align="right"|

|-
 
|style="width: 130px"|NDP
|Dwain Lingenfelter
|align="right"|2,778
|align="right"|38.01%
|align="right"|+2.67

 
|Prog. Conservative
|Jim Lacey
|align="right"|2,145
|align="right"|29.35%
|align="right"|+10.61
|- bgcolor="white"
!align="left" colspan=3|Total
!align="right"|7,308
!align="right"|100.00%
!align="right"|

|-
 
|style="width: 130px"|NDP
|Dwain Lingenfelter
|align="right"|2,897
|align="right"|38.57%
|align="right"|+0.56
 
|Progressive Conservative
|John Bleackley
|align="right"|2,730
|align="right"|36.35%
|align="right"|+7.00

|- bgcolor="white"
!align="left" colspan=3|Total
!align="right"|7,511
!align="right"|100.00%
!align="right"|

|-
 
|style="width: 130px"|Progressive Conservative
|Ted Gleim
|align="right"|3,311
|align="right"|47.70%
|align="right"|+11.35
 
|NDP
|Dwain Lingenfelter
|align="right"|2,968
|align="right"|42.76%
|align="right"|+4.19

|- bgcolor="white"
!align="left" colspan=3|Total
!align="right"|6,941
!align="right"|100.00%
!align="right"|

|-
 
|style="width: 130px"|NDP
|Glen McPherson
|align="right"|2,350
|align="right"|37.27%
|align="right"|-5.49
 
|Prog. Conservative
|Ted Gleim
|align="right"|2,222
|align="right"|35.24%
|align="right"|-12.46

|- bgcolor="white"
!align="left" colspan=3|Total
!align="right"|6,305
!align="right"|100.00%
!align="right"|

See also
Electoral district (Canada)
List of Saskatchewan provincial electoral districts
List of Saskatchewan general elections
List of political parties in Saskatchewan
Shaunavon, Saskatchewan
Gull Lake, Saskatchewan

References
Saskatchewan Archives Board – Saskatchewan Election Results By Electoral Division

Former provincial electoral districts of Saskatchewan
Grassy Creek No. 78, Saskatchewan
Gull Lake No. 139, Saskatchewan